The Real Housewives of Miami is an American reality television series that premiered on February 22, 2011, on Bravo. After an 8 year hiatus, the series was brought back by streaming service Peacock with a premiere of December 2021. The series fifth season chronicles the lives of six women (all since season four) in and around several communities in Miami— Alexia Nepola, Larsa Pippen, Lisa Hochstein, Guerdy Abraira, Julia Lemigova, and Dr. Nicole Martin —as they balance their personal and business lives, along with their social circle.

Former cast members featured over the previous three seasons are: Lea Black (1-3), Adriana de Moura (1-3), Marysol Patton (1-2), Cristy Rice (1), Joanna Krupa (2-3), Ana Quincoces (2), and Karent Sierra (2).

As of March 16, 2023, a total of 73 original episodes of The Real Housewives of Miami have aired.

Series overview

Episodes

Season 1 (2011) 

Lea Black, Adriana de Moura, Alexia Nepola, Marysol Patton, Larsa Pippen and Cristy Rice are introduced as series regulars.

Season 2 (2012–13) 

Nepola, Pippen and Rice departed as series regulars. Lisa Hochstein, Joanna Krupa, Ana Quincoces and Karent Sierra joined the cast. Nepola then served in a recurring capacity.

Season 3 (2013) 

Patton, Quincoces and Sierra departed as series regulars. Nepola rejoined the cast as a series regular. Patton and Quincoces then served in recurring capacities.

Season 4 (2021–22) 

Black, de Moura and Krupa departed as series regulars. Pippen rejoined the cast as a series regular. Guerdy Abraira, Julia Lemigova and Nicole Martin joined the cast. de Moura, Patton and Kiki Barth served in recurring capacities.

Season 5 (2022–23) 

The entire cast of the previous season returned.

References

External links 
 
 

The Real Housewives of Miami
Lists of American non-fiction television series episodes
Lists of American reality television series episodes